Martin Emmrich and Andreas Siljeström were the defending champions but decided Emmrich not to participate.
Siljeström played alongside Jordan Kerr, losing in the first round.
Mikhail Elgin and Igor Zelenay defeated Uladzimir Ignatik and Jimmy Wang 4–6, 7–6(7–0), [10–4] in the final to win the title.

Seeds

Draw

Draw

References
 Main Draw

IPP Open - Doubles
2012 Doubles